1757 Porvoo, provisional designation , is a presumably stony asteroid from the inner regions of the asteroid belt, approximately 10 kilometers in diameter. It was discovered on 17 March 1939, by Finnish astronomer Yrjö Väisälä at Turku Observatory on the coast of southwestern Finland. The asteroid was named for the Finnish city of Porvoo.

Orbit and classification 

Porvoo orbits the Sun in the inner main-belt at a distance of 2.1–2.6 AU once every 3 years and 7 months (1,317 days). Its orbit has an eccentricity of 0.13 and an inclination of 4° with respect to the ecliptic. As no precoveries were taken, and no prior identifications were made, Porvoos observation arc begins with its official discovery observation.

Physical characteristics

Rotation period 

In the early 1980s, a rotational lightcurve of Porvoo was obtained from photometric observations taken by American astronomer Richard P. Binzel using the 0.91- and 2.1-m telescopes at the University of Texas McDonald Observatory. It gave it a well-defined rotation period of 4.89 hours with a brightness variation of 0.30 magnitude.

Diameter and albedo 

According to the surveys carried out by NASA's Wide-field Infrared Survey Explorer with its subsequent NEOWISE mission, Porvoo measures 10.03 and 12.81 kilometers in diameter, and its surface has an albedo of 0.049 and 0.073, respectively.

The Collaborative Asteroid Lightcurve Link assumes a standard albedo for stony asteroids of 0.20 – contrary to the rather carbonaceous albedo given by the space-based surveys – and calculates a diameter of 6.32 kilometers with an absolute magnitude of 13.36.

Naming 

This minor planet was named for Porvoo, Finnish city and municipality located on the southern coast of Finland, and east of the capital Helsinki.

Porvoo is one of the six medieval towns in Finland, and is its second oldest city after Turku, location of the discovering observatory. In 1809, at the Diet of Porvoo, the Russian czar confirmed that Finland was annexed to the Russian empire as an autonomous nation. The official naming citation was published by the Minor Planet Center on 1 August 1980.

References

External links 
 Asteroid Lightcurve Database (LCDB), query form (info )
 Dictionary of Minor Planet Names, Google books
 Asteroids and comets rotation curves, CdR – Observatoire de Genève, Raoul Behrend
 Discovery Circumstances: Numbered Minor Planets (1)-(5000) – Minor Planet Center
 
 

 

001757
Discoveries by Yrjö Väisälä
Named minor planets
19390317